The term blue frog may refer to:
 Blue poison dart frog (Dentrobates tinctorius "azureus"), a frog in the family Dendrobatidae found in southern Suriname and adjacent far northern Brazil
 Australian green tree frog (Litoria caerulea), a frog in the family Hylidae native to Australia and New Guinea, actually green but originally called "blue frog" due to damaged specimens
 Various characters:
 Rockit, a blue-colour tree frog in The Roly Mo Show
 Pierre, a blue-and-yellow frog  in Sesame Street (Japan)

As Blue Frog, it may also refer to:
 Blue Frog, an anti-spamming service
 Blue Frog (restaurant), a Western cuisine restaurant chain in China
 "The Little Blue Frog", a Miles Davis track added to Big Fun
 "I'm In Love With a Big Blue Frog", a Peter, Paul, & Mary song on Album 1700
 "Blue Frog Tavern", a solo adventure for role-playing game Tunnels & Trolls

Animal common name disambiguation pages